Sir Tejinder Singh Virdee,  (Punjabi: ਤਜਿੰਦਰ ਸਿੰਘ ਵਿਰਦੀ, born 13 October 1952), is a Kenyan-born British experimental particle physicist and Professor of Physics at Imperial College London. He is best known for originating the concept of the Compact Muon Solenoid (CMS) with a few other colleagues and has been referred to as one of the 'founding fathers'  of the project. CMS is a world-wide collaboration which started in 1991 and now has over 3500 participants from 45 countries.

Virdee was elected Fellow of the Royal Society and of the Institute of Physics (IOP) in 2012. In recognition of his work on CMS he has been awarded the IOP High Energy Particle Physics group prize (2007) and the IOP Chadwick Medal and Prize (2009). In 2012, he was awarded the 2013 Special Breakthrough Prize in Fundamental Physics
for 'leadership in the scientific endeavour that led to the discovery of the new Higgs-like particle by the ATLAS and CMS collaborations at CERN's Large Hadron Collider (LHC) along with 6 other physicists. He was awarded the 2013 European Physical Society High Energy and Particle Physics Prize and the 2017 American Physical Society Panofsky Prize for his pioneering work and outstanding leadership in the making of the CMS experiment. In 2020 he was awarded the Blaise Pascal Medal of the European Academy of Sciences in Physics. He was also on the Physical Sciences jury for the Infosys Prize in 2020.

In 2014, Virdee was knighted in the Queen's Birthday Honours list for services to science.

Early life and education
Tejinder Virdee was born in 1952 to Udham Kaur and Chain Singh Virdee in Nyeri, Kenya. Virdee went to school in Kisumu at the Kisumu Boys High School. Due to the prevailing circumstances in Kenya at the time, his family (of Indian Sikh origin) emigrated in 1967 to Birmingham, England. He credits part of his interest in physics to Howard Stockley, his physics teacher at King's Norton Boys' School, Birmingham, whom he describes as an 'inspirational teacher'. He also remembers visiting Birmingham Museum of Science and Industry, where he stumbled across a cloud chamber sparking his interest in the study of the structure of matter. Virdee obtained a B.Sc. in Physics from Queen Mary College, University of London in 1974.

Research career
After completing his Ph.D. at Imperial College London, on an experiment conducted at the Stanford Linear Accelerator Center (SLAC) in California, he joined CERN in 1979 as a Fellow of the Experimental Physics Division. Virdee’s early scientific career (1979-1984) involved verifying the strange notion that the “quarks” (the constituents of the protons the neutrons and all other hadrons) carry fractional electric charge. This was successfully demonstrated by the NA14 photoproduction experiment at CERN in the mid-eighties. Following NA14 he joined the UA1 experiment at CERN's proton-antiproton collider (SPS) where his interest in high-performance calorimetry was developed, leading to his invention of a novel technique of collecting light in plastic scintillator-based calorimeters.

Towards the end of UA1, (1990) Virdee, with a few other colleagues, started planning an experiment based on a high field solenoid that would be able to identify the missing elements of the Standard Model (SM) and also to probe in full the physics of the TeV scale. This was to become the CMS experiment at the LHC, one of the most complex instruments science has ever seen. Since 1991 Virdee has played a crucial role in all phases of CMS. Over the last two decades this has covered conceptual design, intensive R&D, prototyping, construction, installation, commissioning, data-taking and finally physics exploitation. He has been the driving force behind many of the major technology decisions made in CMS, especially the selection of the calorimeter technologies. The CMS hadron calorimeter uses the technique he had invented earlier.

The possibility of discovering a Higgs-like boson played a crucial role in the conceptual design of CMS,  and served as a benchmark to test the performance of the experiment. In 1990 Virdee and a colleague, Christopher Seez, carried out the first detailed simulation studies of the most plausible way to detect the SM Higgs boson in the low-mass region in the environment of the LHC: via its decay into two photons. Understanding that dense scintillating crystals offer arguably the best possibility of achieving excellent energy resolution, Virdee made a compelling case for the use of lead tungstate scintillating crystals (PbWO4) for the electromagnetic calorimeter of CMS and then led the team that proved the viability of this technique, a technique that has played a crucial role in the discovery of the new heavy boson, in July 2012. Virdee was deeply involved in this search for the Higgs boson, especially via its two-photon decay mode.

Virdee was the deputy project leader of CMS between 1993 and 2006 and was then elected project leader (Spokesperson) in January 2007 for a period of three years. He oversaw the final stages of construction, installation and data taking with the first collisions at the LHC.

Virdee is a major voice in arguing for the long-term future of the LHC accelerator and its experiments. An increase in the interaction rate by almost a factor of around ten is being advocated for the CMS and ATLAS experiments. To benefit fully from this luminosity increase the CMS detector will be upgraded. Virdee is leading efforts to replace the detector's endcaps with a novel silicon-based technology that measures the energy and momentum of particles to unprecedented levels of precision.

Beyond his contributions to particle physics he is a promoter of science and education, especially in Africa. He funds science-related education activities in schools and universities in Africa, India and the United Kingdom.

Invited lectures and outreach
Virdee has given several keynote speeches at international conferences, opening or closing addresses at particle physics conferences and public lectures on the LHC Project.
These include the 2007 Schrödinger Lecture, the 2012 Peter Lindsay Lectures at Imperial College, the 16th Kaczmarczik Lecture at Drexel University, Philadelphia in 2011, the Keynote Speech at the 2009 Intel International Science and Engineering Fair, Reno, USA and joint lectures on the LHC Project with Prof. Edward Witten in Philadelphia, U.S.A. (2008) and Split, Croatia (2009).

Amongst his interviews are a dialogue with A. C. Grayling, and an interview with Jim Al-Khalili on the BBC Radio 4 programme “The Life Scientific”.

Professional Awards
 2020 Awarded the Blaise Pascal Medal of the European Academy of Sciences in Physics.
 2018 Awarded Doctor of Science (honoris causa) by Panjab University, Chandigarh, India.
 2017 Awarded the Panofsky Prize of the American Physical Society.
 2015 Awarded the Institute of Physics Richard Glazebrook Medal and Prize.
 2013 Awarded the European Physical Society High Energy Physics Prize.
 2013 Awarded Doctor of Science (honoris causa) by University of Lyon.
2013 Awarded Doctor of Science (honoris causa) by Queen Mary University of London, his alma mater.
 2012 Awarded the 2013 Special Breakthrough Prize in Fundamental Physics.
 2009 Awarded the Institute of Physics James Chadwick Medal and Prize.
 2007 Awarded the European Physical Society High Energy and Particle Physics Prize.

Bibliography

Public Lectures
 2018 "Exploring Nature Moments after the Big Bang", H. C. Hans Memorial Lecture, 5 March 2018, Panjab University, Chandigarh, India.
 2016 "The Long Road to the Higgs boson and Beyond”, J. N. Tata Memorial Lecture, IISc Bangalore, India.
 2016  “The Long Road to the Higgs boson and Beyond”, Alan Astbury Lecture, Victoria, Canada.
 2013 "The Quest for the Higgs boson at the LHC: A Historical Perspective”, Barcelona, Spain
 2012 Peter Lindsay Lectures at Imperial College.
 2012 Special lecture on the discovery of the Higgs Boson at Imperial College London (video).
 2012 “Searching for the Higgs boson”, Cheltenham Science Festival, U.K.
 2011 “Exploring Nature Moments after the Big Bang: The LHC Accelerator and the CMS Experiment”, 16th Kaczmarczik Lecture, Drexel University, Philadelphia, U.S.A.
 2009 “Discovering the Quantum Universe; The LHC Project at CERN”, Keynote Speaker at the Intel Science and Engineering Fair in Reno, U.S.A. (video)
 2008 “Discovering the Quantum Universe; The LHC Project at CERN”, International Conference on High Energy Physics, Philadelphia, USA with Prof. E. Witten.
 2007 “Discovering the Quantum Universe: The Large Hadron Collider Project at CERN”, 20th Schrodinger Lecture, Centennial of Imperial College: London, U.K. (video)

Video and Radio
 2013 Participated in workshops promoting science education in Africa to Secondary Schools students with the BBC World Service programmes for “BBC Festival of Science Africa”, broadcast from Makerere University, Kampala, Uganda. (audio)
 2012 Featured on the BBC Radio programme, “Life Scientific”, that discusses the scientific life of individual scientists, 20 March 2012. (audio)
 2009 Dialogue on the LHC project and CMS with Prof. A. C. Grayling, broadcast on BBC World Service programme “Exchanges at the Frontier”. (audio | video)

Other Recognition
 2015 Awarded the Outstanding Achievement in Science and Technology award at The Asian Awards
2014 Asian Achievers Awards: Professional of the Year.
2013 GG2 Award. 
2010 The Sikh Awards: Sikhs in Education. 
2010 Named 62nd in “EUREKA 100: The Science List” - The London Times' 100 most important figures in British science.
2007 Named in the list of “100 Personalities that make Swiss Romandie”; l’Hebdo magazine, Switzerland.

See also 
 List of British Sikhs

References

External links

 Imperial High Energy Physics Group
 CERN CMS
 

1952 births
Living people
British physicists
Knights Bachelor
Kenyan emigrants to the United Kingdom
Kenyan people of Indian descent
British people of Indian descent
People associated with CERN
People from Birmingham, West Midlands
British people of Punjabi descent
Winners of the Panofsky Prize
Fellows of the Royal Society